İskenderun Sahilspor is a defunct sports club of İskenderun, Turkey.

Stadium
The team used to play at the 12400 capacity 5 Temmuz Stadium.

League participations
 TFF Second League: 1987–1993

League performances

Source: mackolik: Hatay Sahilspor

References

External links

Sport in İskenderun
Football clubs in Hatay
Defunct football clubs in Turkey